Chris Bandak (born January 13, 1979) is a Palestinian militant, who was convicted in Israel for shooting at Israeli motorists, during the Second Intifada. He is a Greek Orthodox Christian.

Life
Bandak was born into a Palestinian Christian family on January 13, 1979, in Bethlehem. He was born near the Church of the Nativity, said to mark the birthplace of Jesus of Nazareth, and his parents gave him the name Chris through its association with messiahship and since they believe Jesus to be of Palestinian descent as well as a savior of the Palestinians. He has an older brother named Khader. Chris' mother abandoned them when he was one years old. He was reportedly a leader of the Al-Aqsa Martyrs' Brigades and the Tanzim, both resistance wings of the Fatah movement. As a result of conviction for crimes related to this involvement he was imprisoned by Israel on February 6, 2003.

He was released in 2011 as part of an exchange for the release of Israeli soldier Gilad Shalit.

References

Palestinian militants
Palestinian Christians
Living people
20th-century criminals
Eastern Orthodox Christians from Palestine
Palestinian assassins
Palestinian people convicted of murder
Palestinian people imprisoned by Israel
Palestinian prisoners sentenced to life imprisonment
Members of the Greek Orthodox Church of Jerusalem
People from Bethlehem
1979 births